"Million Tears" is a song written by Kasey Chambers, produced by Nash Chambers for Chambers's second album Barricades & Brickwalls. It was released as the album's fourth single in 2002. It peaked at number 32.

Track listing
 "Million Tears" – 4:17
 "Runaway Train" (live) – 3:28
 "The Captain" (live acoustic version) – 5:06
 "Not Pretty Enough" (live acoustic version) – 3:14

Charts

References

2002 singles
Kasey Chambers songs
2001 songs
EMI Records singles
Songs written by Kasey Chambers